Awapoko River is an estuary, almost  long, where the Aurere and Parapara Streams merge before entering Doubtless Bay in the Northland Region of New Zealand.

Ngāti Kahu had lived in the area for about 700 years until most of their land was sold under government pressure in the 1850s.

The present land use is predominantly a mix of agriculture, forestry, housing along SH10, indigenous vegetation and sand-dunes.

Spotless crake, banded rail, bittern and herons live in the estuary.

Despite court action in 2011, a 2016 report said the Aurere Stream "stands out in particular as having degraded water quality".

Construction of Kupe Waka Centre, begun by Hector Busby, on the banks of the river, started in 2014.

The small, steep sided Puketu Island is in the bay just to the east of the river mouth.

References 

Far North District
Rivers of the Northland Region
Rivers of New Zealand